Wang Jiong (born 5 January 1994) is a Chinese footballer who currently plays for Chinese Super League side Shandong Luneng.

Club career
Wang Jiong started his football career when he played for China League Two side Shandong Youth in 2011 and 2012. In August 2013, he was loaned to Campeonato de Portugal side Casa Pia for one season. Wang was promoted to Shandong Luneng's first team squad by Cuca in the 2015 season. On 4 May 2016, he made his debut for Shandong in the last group match of 2016 AFC Champions League against Buriram United with a 0–0 away draw, coming on as a substitution for Zhang Chi in the 48th minute. He made his Super League debut on 9 July 2016 in a 2–1 victory against Jiangsu Suning.

On 23 June 2018, Wang was loaned to China League Two side Sichuan Jiuniu for the rest of the season. He made his debut on the same day in a 1–1 away draw against Zhenjiang Huasa. On 7 July 2018, he scored an own goal in a 3–0 away defeat against Dalian Yifang in the Quarter-Finals of 2018 Chinese FA Cup.
In February 2019, Wang was loaned to China League One side Beijing BSU for the 2019 season.

Career statistics 
.

References

External links
 

1994 births
Living people
Chinese footballers
Footballers from Henan
People from Zhengzhou
Shandong Taishan F.C. players
Sichuan Jiuniu F.C. players
Segunda Divisão players
Beijing Sport University F.C. players
Chinese Super League players
China League One players
Association football defenders
Chinese expatriate footballers
Expatriate footballers in Portugal
Chinese expatriate sportspeople in Portugal